The Christmas Album is the second studio album by Welsh operatic duo Richard & Adam, who first rose to fame on the seventh series of the ITV talent show Britain's Got Talent in 2013, on which they finished third. The album was released on 2 December 2013 through Sony Music as the second album of the two-album contract that they signed after the show. The album consists of cover of various Christmas songs, including "I Saw Three Ships", "Silent Night", "Once in Royal David's City".

Track listing

Chart performance

Weekly charts

Year-end charts

Release history

References

2013 Christmas albums
Christmas albums by Welsh artists
Vocal duet albums
Richard & Adam albums
Sony Music Christmas albums
Classical Christmas albums